Cửu Long was a province in the Mekong Delta region of southern Vietnam. It was created in 1976 from the merger of Vĩnh Long province and Vĩnh Bình province, and in 1992 Cửu Long was re-split into Vĩnh Long and Trà Vinh provinces.

Statistics 
Area: 3,856 km2
Population: 1,979,800 (1992)

Etymology
In Vietnamese, Cửu Long (deriving from the Sino-Vietnamese 九龍) literally means "nine dragons," referring to the Mekong, known in Vietnamese as the "River of Nine Dragons".

The area of Hong Kong called Kowloon shares a common etymology.

References

Bibliography

External links 

 Vietnam provinces

Former provinces of Vietnam
States and territories established in 1976